The Ambroise Paré Hospital (Boulogne-Billancourt) is a celebrated teaching hospital in the prestigious Parisian area Boulogne-Billancourt. It is part of the Assistance Publique – Hôpitaux de Paris which is the largest hospital system in Europe and one of the largest in the world. It is one of the teaching hospitals of Paris-Saclay University, which was ranked 1st university in France and 13th in the world. Paris-Saclay University is a successor of the formerly University of Paris metonymically known as the Sorbonne, which does not exist anymore and has now been divided into 13 universities on the 31st of December 1970. 
It offers health services in a wide range of specialties, and its dermatology department is the referral expert center in Ile-de-France and Parisian region for advanced 
dermatological surgeries.
It has been created in 1923. It was named in honour of Ambroise Paré.

References

External links
Ambroise Paré Hospital (Boulogne-Billancourt)

Hospitals in Île-de-France
Hospital buildings completed in 1923
Hospital buildings completed in the 20th century
Teaching hospitals in France
Buildings and structures in Île-de-France
Hospitals established in 1923
1923 establishments in France
20th-century architecture in France